Johannes Boersma (5 December 1937 Marrum – 29 November 2004 Eindhoven) was a Dutch mathematician who specialized in mathematical analysis. His PhD advisor at the University of Groningen was Adriaan Isak van de Vooren.

Selected publications

References

Obituary: Johannes Boersma (1937–2004), a remarkable mathematician by H. K. Kuiken

1937 births
2004 deaths
20th-century Dutch mathematicians
21st-century  Dutch mathematicians
Mathematical analysts
University of Groningen alumni
Academic staff of the Eindhoven University of Technology
People from Ferwerderadiel